The 2013 Big Ten men's basketball tournament was held from March 14 through March 17 at United Center in Chicago, Illinois.  The tournament was the sixteenth annual Big Ten men's basketball tournament and second to feature 12 teams. The championship was won by Ohio State who defeated Wisconsin in the championship game. As a result, Ohio State received the Big Ten's automatic bid to the NCAA tournament. The win marked Ohio State's fifth tournament championship, though one championship has since been vacated.

Seeds
All 12 Big Ten schools participated in the tournament. Teams were seeded by conference record, with a tiebreaker system used to seed teams with identical conference records. Seeding for the tournament was determined at the close of the regular conference season. The top four teams received a first-round bye. Tiebreaking procedures were unchanged from the 2012 tournament.

Seeding for the tournament was determined at the close of the regular season.

Schedule

*Game times in Central Time.

Bracket

Honors

All-Tournament Team
 Aaron Craft, Ohio State – Big Ten tournament Most Outstanding Player
 Deshaun Thomas, Ohio State
 Ryan Evans, Wisconsin
 Traevon Jackson, Wisconsin
 Cody Zeller, Indiana

References

Big Ten men's basketball tournament
Tournament
Big Ten Conference men's basketball tournament
Big Ten men's basketball tournament